Tagou Martial Arts School is one of China's largest martial arts schools.  It was built in 1978.  It was featured in the movie The Real Shaolin.

References

External links

 – official site 
 – official site 

1978 establishments in China
Educational institutions established in 1978
Education in Zhengzhou
Wushu organizations